The Old Wilson Historic District in Wilson, North Carolina is a  historic district that was listed on the National Register of Historic Places (NRHP) in 1984.  It includes work dating from 1853 and work designed by architect Solon Balias Moore and others.  The listing included 263 contributing buildings, one contributing site, one contributing structure, and three contributing objects.

It includes the separately NRHP-listed Moses Rountree House and the NRHP-listed Davis-Whitehead-Harriss House.

References

Historic districts on the National Register of Historic Places in North Carolina
Queen Anne architecture in North Carolina
Colonial Revival architecture in North Carolina
Geography of Wilson County, North Carolina
National Register of Historic Places in Wilson County, North Carolina